Callum Brae is a suburb in north-eastern Hamilton in New Zealand.

It part of the Rototuna South census area. Hamilton City Council includes Callum Brae as part of Rototuna. Estate agents refer to the area as Rototuna, which is often used to include Callum Brae and other neighbouring suburbs, such as Grosvenor, Somerset Heights, Huntington and St James. In 2012 Hamilton Libraries said Callum Court is in the suburb of Rototuna. It was named in 2000 by Bramley Ltd., the developer, following a theme of naming all streets in the Callum Brae development with Scottish names.

Tauhara Park lies to the west of Callum Brae. Work was done in 2002 to prevent methane from the old Rototuna landfill migrating to Callum Brae and monitoring continues. The leachate is also collected.

Bus 16 has served Callum Brae at half hourly intervals since 2018.

References

See also
 Suburbs of Hamilton, New Zealand

Suburbs of Hamilton, New Zealand